Cascade is a name for several high schools in North America, including:

Cascade High School (Idaho), Cascade, Idaho
Cascade High School (Clayton, Indiana)
Cascade High School (Iowa), Cascade, Iowa
Cascade High School (Montana), Cascade, Montana
Cascade Senior High School (Turner, Oregon)
Cascade High School (Tennessee), Wartrace, Tennessee
Cascade High School (Leavenworth, Washington), Leavenworth, Washington
Cascade High School (Everett, Washington)